Kim's Convenience is a Canadian television sitcom that premiered on CBC Television in October 2016. The series depicts the Korean Canadian Kim family who run a convenience store in the Moss Park neighbourhood of Toronto: parents "Appa" (Paul Sun-Hyung Lee) and "Umma" (Jean Yoon) – Korean for "dad" and "mum" – along with their daughter Janet (Andrea Bang) and estranged son Jung (Simu Liu). Additional characters include Jung's friend and co-worker Kimchee (Andrew Phung) and his manager Shannon (Nicole Power). The series is based on Ins Choi's 2011 play of the same name.

Originally set to premiere on 4 October 2016, on CBC, the series premiere was delayed to 11 October 2016, with back-to-back episodes, so it would not conflict with the Toronto Blue Jays' American League Wild Card Game. The first season consists of 13 half-hour episodes.

CBC announced on December 20, 2016, that it had renewed Kim's Convenience for a second season of 13 episodes. The second season premiered on 26 September 2017. On 12 March 2018, the cast of Kim's Convenience took to Facebook and Twitter to announce that there would be a third season. The third season began airing on 8 January 2019. 

On 24 May 2018, just two months after announcing the third season renewal of the show, CBC announced that the show had also been renewed for a fourth season, which premiered on 7 January 2020. On 31 March 2020, it was announced that the show has been renewed for two more seasons, but on 8 March 2021, it was revealed that the show would end after the fifth season, due to the departure of the show's two co-creators.

Series overview

Episodes

Season 1 (2016)

Season 2 (2017)

Season 3 (2019)

Season 4 (2020)

Season 5 (2021)

References

External links

Lists of Canadian comedy television series episodes
Lists of sitcom episodes
Lists of Canadian sitcom episodes